Civil Service United Football Club-Civo (CIVO United), which represents Civil Services, is a Malawian football (soccer) club based in Lilongwe area 9, the team currently plays in the TNM Super League, the top division of Malawi football. The team is now led by an executive committee which is chaired by Mr Victor Lungu and the current General Secretary is Ronald Chiwaula. The technical panel is led by Franco Ndawa who is deputized by coach Elia Kananji.

In 1987 the team won the TNM Super League.

Stadium
Currently the team plays at the Civo Stadium.

Honours
Super League of Malawi 
 Winners (1): 1987

Players

Current squad

References

External links
Club profile - Soccerway
Tag archives - Nyasatimes.com

Football clubs in Malawi
Lilongwe
Financial services association football clubs in Malawi